Jake Stuart is a Cook Islands footballer, who currently plays for Clarence United FC, in the PS4 National Premier Leagues - Tasmania.

Career 
The defender started for West Ryde Rovers, back in 2014 and joined in the spring 2016 to Hobart Jeep Zebras. He played in 19 games for the Zebras and scored 15 goals, before signed in 2017 for Clarence United FC.

International 
He made his debut for the national team on August 31, 2015 in a 3–0 win against Tonga and is since this time, the Captain. Stuart played in 3 games for the Cook Islands national football team.

References

Living people
1991 births
Association football defenders
Cook Islands international footballers
Cook Island footballers
Expatriate soccer players in Australia